The 2013 GP3 Series was the fourth season of the third-tier of Formula One feeder championship and also fourth season under the moniker of GP3 Series, a motor racing feeder series for Formula One and sister series GP2.

Following a three-year cycle, the previous GP3 chassis was replaced by a brand new car, the GP3/13, built by Italian racing car manufacturer Dallara. The 280 bhp turbo-charged engine used from 2010 to 2012 was upgraded to a 400 bhp naturally-aspirated V6 unit, which will be used until end of 2015. Series organisers have anticipated that the new cars became up to three seconds per lap faster than the GP3/10 chassis; these estimations proved to be accurate during pre-season testing at the Autódromo do Estoril. The re-structuring of the category coincides with the series' organisers' desire to ease the transition between the GP3 Series and parent series GP2, thereby allowing rookie drivers more opportunities to succeed in GP2.

AER was selected as official engine supplier of GP3 Series began in 2013 until 2015 season.

The championship title was secured by Daniil Kvyat with a race to spare after three consecutive feature race wins in Spa, Monza and Abu Dhabi. He had a thirty-point advantage on ART Grand Prix's Facu Regalia, who finished as runner-up. His teammate Conor Daly, who was the feature race winner at Valencia. Tio Ellinas, who led the drivers' standings until the first race at Spa, bookended the season with victories in both the first race and the final race of the season. Jack Harvey completed the top five, helping ART Grand Prix to claim the teams' championship.

Teams and drivers
The following teams and drivers competed in the 2013 season:

Team changes
 The maximum grid size will be formally capped at twenty-seven entries. Thirty had previously been allowed, but this proved unsustainable over time, culminating in the withdrawal of the Ralf Schumacher—Mücke Motorsport collaboration, RSC Mücke, from the 2012 grid.
 After racing as "Lotus GP" in 2011 and 2012, ART Grand Prix will revert to using its original name in 2013.
 World Touring Car Championship team Bamboo Engineering will replace Atech CRS Grand Prix.
 Ocean Racing Technology withdrew from both the GP3 Series and sister series GP2 after the 2012 season. Their place in the GP3 Series was taken by Formula Renault 2.0 series regulars Koiranen Motorsport, competing under the name Koiranen GP.

Driver changes

Entering/Re-entering GP3
 Ryan Cullen, who raced in the British Formula Ford, joined Marussia Manor Racing to make his GP3 Series debut.
 Jimmy Eriksson, the 2012 German Formula Three champion, entered GP3 with Status Grand Prix.
 Adderly Fong, who placed third in the National Class of the 2012 British Formula 3 Championship, made his debut in GP3 with Status Grand Prix.
 Samin Gómez, who drove for Jenzer Motorsport in the 2012 Formula Abarth championship, continued her association with the team when she joins the GP3 Series grid in 2013.
 British Formula 3 champion Jack Harvey made his GP3 debut with ART Grand Prix.
 Formula Renault 2.0 Alps driver Patrick Kujala continued his association with Koiranen GP when he makes his debut in the GP3 Series.
 Formula Renault 2.0 Alps champion Daniil Kvyat made his debut in the series, driving for MW Arden.
 Formula Renault 3.5 Series driver Kevin Korjus switched to GP3 with Koiranen GP.
 Eric Lichtenstein, who placed third in the 2012 British Formula Ford championship, made his GP3 Series debut with Carlin.
 Melville McKee, who contested the 2012 Eurocup Formula Renault 2.0 season moved to the GP3 Series with Bamboo Engineering.
 Luís Sá Silva entered the GP3 Series with Carlin, moving from the now-defunct Formula 3 Euro Series.
 FIA European Formula 3 Championship driver Carlos Sainz Jr. made his debut in the series, driving for MW Arden.
 Josh Webster moved from the Formula Renault BARC championship to GP3, racing for Status Grand Prix.
 Nick Yelloly returned to the GP3 Series with Carlin after racing in the Formula Renault 3.5 Series in 2012.
 Dino Zamparelli made his debut in the GP3 Series for Marussia Manor Racing, moving from the now-defunct Formula Two championship.
 After placing fifth in the 2012 Formula Abarth championship, Sammarinese driver Emanuele Zonzini moved to the GP3 Series, driving for Trident Racing.

Changing teams
 David Fumanelli moved to Trident Racing after losing his seat at MW Arden.
 Carmen Jordá left the now-defunct Ocean Racing Technology to join to Bamboo Engineering. Roberto La Rocca had previously been scheduled to drive the car, but was forced to withdraw due to uncertainty over his sponsorship following the death of Venezuelan president Hugo Chávez.
 After four races with Jenzer Motorsport and Atech CRS GP in 2012, Facu Regalia switched to ART Grand Prix.
 Aaro Vainio, who competed for Lotus GP in 2012, moved to newcoming team Koiranen GP.
 After racing for Jenzer Motorsport in 2012, Robert Vișoiu switched to MW Arden in 2013.
 Lewis Williamson switched from Status Grand Prix to series newcomers Bamboo Engineering.

Leaving GP3
 Lotus GP driver Daniel Abt left the series to graduate into GP2 with Lotus.
 Alex Brundle left the GP3 Series and instead moved to the FIA World Endurance Championship.
 William Buller, who drove for Carlin in 2012, decided to concentrate on the newly formed European Formula Three Championship.
 Kevin Ceccon returned to the GP2 Series, starting a campaign with Trident Racing.
 Mitch Evans, who won the 2012 championship with MW Arden, left the series, continuing his relationship with Arden in the GP2 Series.
 António Félix da Costa announced that he had left the GP3 Series to take part in a full Formula Renault 3.5 Series season in 2013.
 Matias Laine moved to the Formula Renault 3.5 Series.
 Fabiano Machado had no drive for the 2013 season.
 Tamás Pál Kiss moved to Auto GP.
 Vicky Piria, who competed for Trident Racing in 2012, lost her seat at the team and switched to the European F3 Open Championship.
 Ethan Ringel left the GP3 Series after a single season, returning to America to compete in the Indy Lights series.
 Kotaro Sakurai did not have a drive for 2013.
 Antonio Spavone did not return to Trident Racing in 2013, concentrating on the Auto GP.
 Marlon Stöckinger left the GP3 Series, moving to Formula Renault 3.5 with Lotus.
 Dmitry Suranovich switched from the GP3 Series to the FIA European Formula 3 Championship, competing for Fortec Motorsports.

Mid-season changes
 Alexander Sims replaced Adderly Fong at Status Grand Prix for the round at the Nürburgring as Fong had a clashing race in China. Sims remained in the series from the following round at Spa-Francorchamps, replacing Eric Lichtenstein at Carlin.
 Both Robert Cregan and Alice Powell returned to the series, replacing David Fumanelli and Melville McKee at Trident and Bamboo Engineering for the final round at the Yas Marina Circuit respectively.
 2010 FIA Formula Two Champion Dean Stoneman made his return in single seaters, taking Aaro Vainio's seat at Koiranen GP.

Calendar
The official calendar for the 2013 series was unveiled on 19 December 2012. The format remains largely unchanged from 2012, with seven rounds of the championship in support of the 2013 Formula One season and sister series GP2, plus the addition of a stand-alone round at Circuit Ricardo Tormo.

Calendar changes
 The series did not return to the Circuit de Monaco in 2013.
 The GP3 Series hosted a stand-alone event for the first time in 2013 at the Circuit Ricardo Tormo.
 The round scheduled to be held at the Valencia Street Circuit was discontinued after the European Grand Prix was removed from the 2013 Formula One season calendar.
 The 2013 season saw the GP3 Series hold a round outside Europe for the first time, with the final round of the championship scheduled to be held at the Yas Marina Circuit in Abu Dhabi.

Results

Championship standings
Scoring system
Points were awarded to the top 10 classified finishers in the race 1, and to the top 8 classified finishers in the race 2. The pole-sitter in the race 1 also received four points, and two points were given to the driver who set the fastest lap inside the top ten in both the race 1 and race 2. No extra points were awarded to the pole-sitter in the race 2.

Race 1 points

Race 2 points
Points were awarded to the top 8 classified finishers.

Drivers' championship

Notes:
† — Drivers did not finish the race, but were classified as they completed over 90% of the race distance.

Teams' championship

Notes:
† — Drivers did not finish the race, but were classified as they completed over 90% of the race distance.

Footnotes

References

External links
 

GP3 Series
GP3 Series seasons
GP3
GP3 Series